Sepidan (which means "The Whiteland" in Persian) may refer to:
Sepidan County, an administrative subdivision of Fars Province, Iran
Ardakan, capital  of Sepidan County, Fars Province, Iran
Beyza, a city in Sepidan County, Fars Province, Iran
Esfidan, village in Natanz County, Isfahan Province, Iran